Benjamin Petre (10 August 1672 – 22 December 1758) was an English Roman Catholic prelate, Vicar Apostolic of the London District from 1734.

Life
He was born the son of John Petre (1617–1690) of Fidlers or Fithlers, Essex (who was a younger brother of William Petre the translator), by his second wife, Elizabeth, daughter of John Pincheon of Writtle. He was educated at the English College, Douai, and, after being admitted to the priesthood, became tutor to Lord Derwentwater, who was subsequently beheaded for treason.

He was consecrated titular bishop of Prusa on 11 November 1721, and appointed coadjutor bishop with right of succession Bonaventure Giffard, at that time vicar-apostolic of the London district. Although the penal laws were no longer enforced with extreme rigor, the life of many Catholic priests was still a difficult one, especially in London. On Gifford's death on 12 March 1734, he succeeded to the vicariate. In 1739, Petre asked for Richard Challoner as coadjutor; and Challoner was duly consecrated in January 1741. 

Petre believed that as vicar-apostolic of the London District, he had jurisdiction over all of British America. However, responsibility had been "de facto" held by the English Province of the Society of Jesus. When the Curia discovered there had been no formal designation, it forwarded the documents to Petre, in January 1757.
  
Petre resided chiefly at Fidlers. He was buried in St Edmund's College, Ware. He was succeeded by Challoner.

References

Sources

1672 births
1758 deaths
Apostolic vicars of England and Wales
18th-century Roman Catholic bishops in England
Benjamin